Rafael Rodríguez Padilla (January 23, 1890 – January 24, 1929) was a Guatemalan painter, printmaker and sculptor. In 1920 he was cofounder and became the first director of the Guatemalan Academia Nacional de Bellas Artes (National Academy of Fine Arts), which merged into the Escuela Nacional de Artes Plásticas "Rafael Rodríguez Padilla".

Rodríguez studied sculpture under the Venezuelan Santiago González (1850–1909) in Guatemala. Afterwards he went to Spain, where he finished his studies under Luis Muriel y López. After his return to Guatemala, he painted his famous self-portrait. He committed suicide in 1929.

Selected works 
 self-portrait, 1915
 Lorenzo Montúfar y Rivera monument in the Avenida La Reforma, 1923
 Francisco Vela monument
 José Milla y Vidaurre monument
 Louis Pasteur monument
 Mausoleum of the Castillo family, (together with Cristóbal Azori), Guatemala City General Cemetery
 art nude
 portrait of Jaime Sabartés, 1923
 portrait of Santiago González

References 

Guatemalan artists
1890 births
1929 suicides
Artists who committed suicide
Suicides in Guatemala
1929 deaths
Guatemalan expatriates in Spain